Wycheproof Airport  is located at Wycheproof, Victoria, Australia.

See also
 List of airports in Victoria

References

Airports in Victoria (Australia)